Michael Harper (born 16 February 1945) is a South African cricketer. He played in twenty first-class and two List A matches for Border from 1967/68 to 1976/77.

See also
 List of Border representative cricketers

References

External links
 

1945 births
Living people
South African cricketers
Border cricketers
Cricketers from East London, Eastern Cape